Félicien Tramel, often known simply as Tramel, (1880–1948) was a French film actor.

Selected filmography
 The Crystal Submarine (1927)
 The Porter from Maxim's (1933)
 The Mondesir Heir (1940)
 The Inevitable Monsieur Dubois (1943)
 The Idiot (1946)
 Distress (1946)
 Last Refuge (1947)

References

Bibliography
 Goble, Alan. The Complete Index to Literary Sources in Film. Walter de Gruyter, 1999.

External links

1880 births
1948 deaths
French male film actors
French male silent film actors
20th-century French male actors
Actors from Toulon